The Protomen, colloquially referred to by fans in retrospect as Act I, is the debut album release by indie rock band The Protomen. It is a rock opera loosely based on the Mega Man video game series, and the first volume of a planned trilogy of albums on this theme. The follow-up, Act II: The Father of Death, a prequel to The Protomen, was released on September 8, 2009.

Plot summary
While the plot of the album is adapted from the Mega Man games, it takes substantial liberties with the original storyline, functioning as a dystopic reworking of the games' narrative.

The album begins with a description of a dystopia ruled by Doctor Wily and his army of robots ("Hope Rides Alone"). Doctor Light apparently works for Wily's government, but by night he builds a robot to lead a rebellion against Wily -- Proto Man. After twelve years,  when Proto Man is finished, he is sent to fight Wily's forces and liberate mankind—however, after defeating many of Wily's robots Proto Man is weakened, and the robot army launches a final assault. The human masses, too frightened of Wily to assist Proto Man, allow him to die. Proto Man's funeral is held.  In Doctor Light's grief, he sets about destroying his laboratory, instead building a new robot, Mega Man. ("Funeral for a Son").

Years later, people still talk about Proto Man, and Doctor Light knows that Mega Man will soon find out about his brother. To dissuade Mega Man from attempting to rebel against Wily, Light tells Mega Man Proto Man's story, and explains that the people have "chosen their own end"—they will not fight to save themselves ("Unrest in The House of Light"). Mega Man angrily defies Light  and sets out to defeat Wily on his own, finding Proto Man's grave-site, and amassing a crowd of people as he marches towards Wily's fortress, seeking to avenge his brother's death and to "finish what was started, the fight of Proto Man" ("The Will of One"). Mega Man is able to fight through Wily's army of robots with relative ease, reaching the commander of the robot army ("Vengeance"). However, Mega Man discovers that Proto Man never died—he now defends Wily, who has repaired him and made him the commander of his army. Proto Man declares that mankind does not deserve to be saved if they will not stand for themselves, telling Mega Man that all men are cowardly, and will never fight for themselves ("The Stand"). The two raise their weapons against each other, and argue angrily, Mega Man slowly being convinced by his brother that humanity isn't worth saving ("Sons of Fate"). Confused and encouraged by human onlookers crying out "Destroy him, you can save us, you're our only hope, kill Proto Man", Mega Man delivers a mortal wound to his brother, who tells him before he dies that humanity may one day realize how to save itself. Distraught by the grief of killing his brother, Mega Man flees from the fortress, leaving the crowd of people that had gathered to watch the battle to be slaughtered by Wily's robots ("Due Vendetta").

Critical and press reception
While the album has yet to be reviewed by major music publications, it has received favorable press from 1UP and The Escapist (in the form of an interview with the band). The album has gained a number of supporters from fans of the Mega Man games and music listeners in general, highlighting the storytelling, music, and dark interpretation of the game's mythology. The success of the album, bolstered by an article in the gaming magazine Nintendo Power, began a huge cult following for the band, with fans attending concerts in costumes inspired by the band's storyline and participating by way of singing along with the band's music, which was further exemplified by the group's work in Act II: The Father of Death.

In 2015, Unrest In The House Of Light appeared as a cover song on Murder By Death’s As You Wish: Kickstarter Covers Vol. 2.

Track listing
All tracks written and composed by The Protomen.

References

2005 albums
The Protomen albums
Rock operas